Mobile virtual network operators (MVNOs) in Turkey lease wireless telephone and data spectrum from three major carriers Türk Telekom, Turkcell and Vodafone for resale.

Active operators

Defunct and merged operators

See also 
 Mobile virtual network operator
 List of mobile network operators of Europe#Turkey

References 

 
Mobile virtual network operators
Lists of mobile phone companies
Telecommunications lists